is a Japanese footballer currently playing as a forward or a winger for Gamba Osaka.

Career statistics

Club
.

Notes

References

External links

2001 births
Living people
People from Izumi, Osaka
Association football people from Osaka Prefecture
Japanese footballers
Japan youth international footballers
Association football forwards
J1 League players
J3 League players
Gamba Osaka players
Gamba Osaka U-23 players